Raj Jain (born 17 August 1951) is a professor of Computer Science and Engineering in the Washington University School of Engineering and Applied Science at Washington University in St. Louis, Missouri.

Education
Dr. Jain obtained a Ph.D. in Applied Mathematics (Computer Science) from Harvard University, Cambridge, Massachusetts in 1978, an M.E. in Automation from Indian Institute of Science Bangalore, India in 1974, and a B.E. in Electrical Engineering from Awdhesh Pratap Singh University, Rewa, Madhya Pradesh, India in 1972.

Affiliations
Until 2005 he was the Chief Technology Officer and Co-Founder of Nayna Networks, Inc. – a next generation telecommunications systems company in San Jose, CA. Prior to that he was a professor of Computer and Information Sciences at the Ohio State University in Columbus, Ohio and a Senior Consulting Engineer at Digital Equipment Corporation in Littleton, Massachusetts. He was also a visiting scientist at Massachusetts Institute of Technology in 1983, 1985, and 1987. He has been a professor at Washington University in St. Louis, Missouri since 2005.

Research contributions
Dr. Jain is the co-inventor of the DECbit scheme for congestion avoidance in computer networks which has been adapted for implementation in Frame Relay networks as forward explicit congestion notification (FECN), ATM Networks as Explicit Forward Congestion Indication (EFCI), and TCP/IP networks as Explicit Congestion Notification (ECN).

He is also the co-inventor of the Additive Increase Multiplicative Decrease (AIMD) principle used for traffic management in computer networks and Jain's fairness index.

His work on timeout based congestion control influenced the design of the slow start algorithm in TCP/IP networks.

Publications
He is author of four books. His second book The Art of Computer Systems Performance Analysis published by Wiley Interscience won the 1991 Best Advanced How-to Book, Systems award from Computer Press Association.

References

American computer scientists
American technology writers
Researchers in distributed computing
Fellow Members of the IEEE
Fellows of the Association for Computing Machinery
Harvard University alumni
Indian Institute of Science alumni
Washington University in St. Louis faculty
People from Madhya Pradesh
Indian emigrants to the United States
People from Satna
Technology evangelists
21st-century American engineers
1951 births
Living people
Writers from St. Louis
Businesspeople from St. Louis
American Jains
American inventors
American academics of Indian descent
Washington University in St. Louis mathematicians